American hip hop group Naughty by Nature have released seven studio albums, two compilation albums and eighteen singles.

Albums

Studio albums

Compilation albums

Mixtapes

Singles

Music videos
1991: "O.P.P"
1992: "Everything's Gonna Be Alright"
1992: "Uptown Anthem"
1993: "Hip Hop Hooray"
1993: "It's On"
1993: "Written on Ya Kitten"
1995: "Craziest"
1995: "Feel Me Flow"
1995: "Clap Yo Hands"
1995: "Chain Remains"
1995: "Hang Out and Hustle"
1995: "Klickow Klickow" 
1997: "Mourn You Til I Join You" 
1998: "Work" 
1999: "Dirt All By My Lonely" 
1999: "Live or Die"
1999: "Jamboree"
1999: "Holiday"
1999: "Naughty by Nature" (Megamix)
2002: "Feels Good (Don't Worry Bout a Thing)"
2010: "I Gotta Lotta"
2010: "Heavy in My Chevy"
2011: "Flags"
2011: "Perfect Party"
2011: "Get to Know Me Better" (unreleased)
2016: "God Is Us" featuring Queen Latifah

Treach guest appearances

Featured music videos 

 1993 Da Youngstas feat. Treach – "Crews Pop"
 1995 Boyz II Men feat. Treach, Busta Rhymes, Craig Mack and Method Man – "Vibin'"
 1995 South Central Cartel feat. Spice 1, Boss, Ice-T, Treach & Powerlord JEL – "No Peace"
 1996 L.V. feat. Treach – "Throw Your Hands Up"
 1996 Monica feat. Treach – "Ain't Nobody"
 1999 3rd Storee feat. Treach & RL – "Party Tonight"
 2011 Peter Jackson feat. Treach – "Certified"

Cameo appearances 

 1991 Michael Jackson – "Jam"
 1993 RUN-DMC – "Down With The King"
 1994 Salt-n-Pepa – "Whatta Man"
 1995 The Notorious B.I.G. - "Big Poppa"
 1995 2Pac – "Temptations"
 1998 Gang Starr – "Royalty"

Notes

References

External links
 Official website
 
 
 

Hip hop discographies
Discography